, also written as 飯綱山 (Iizuna-yama), is a mountain located ten kilometers north-northwest of the heart of Nagano, Nagano Prefecture, Japan. The mountain straddles the city of Nagano and Iizuna town  in Kamiminochi District, Nagano. Together with  1875.0 m,  1748 m, and others, it forms the Iizuna range. It has an elevation of 1,917 metres.

Mount Iizuna is located with Myōkō-Togakushi Renzan National Park, and is one of the "Five Mountains of Northern Shinshu" (北信五岳) that also includes Mount Myōkō, Mount Kurohime, Mount Togakushi, and Mount Madarao. The mountain is one of the 200 most famous mountains in Japan (日本二百名山 Nihon 200 meizan), and one of the 100 most famous mountains in Nagano (信州百名山).

This mountain is a sacred site for mountain-based religious sects such as Shugendo, and said to be the home of a tengu named Saburō. According to legend, there was once a strange, edible sand somewhere on the mountain, which the tengu would distribute in times of poor harvest. At the entrances of the hiking trails, there are several torii and komainu, the South Trail includes 13 stone Buddhas, and there is a shrine located near the summit.

Leisure activities

Hiking
The mountain has popular hiking trails, which can be hiked in all seasons (with appropriate gear in winter), leading to the summit in approximately 2-2.5 hours depending on fitness level. Parking is available. The bus stop is in front of Nagano Country Club. From the Izuna Trailhead (1,126m), the trail rises to 1,917m over approximately 4 km of hiking. There are no chains or ladders on the trail, and little technical skill is required. Another popular trail,  leaves from the village of Togakushi, at an elevation of 1,225m.

The summit provides 360° degree views, including panoramic views of Nagano City, Mount Togakushi, Mount Takatsuma, one of the 100 Famous Japanese Mountains, and Mount Kurohime throughout year; and especially in winter, the Hida Mountains, Yatsugatake Mountains, and Mount Fuji can be seen. Note, however, that specialty gear, including crampons, are required in winter. From the summit, it is also possible to ascend from or descend to Togakushi via Mount Menō (瑪瑙山) (1748m) and Togakushi Ski Field.

Skiing
The mountain is also a popular area for skiing and is where the bobsleigh and luge track for the 1998 Winter Olympics is located. Freestyle skiing events for these olympics took place at Iizuna Resort (いいずなリゾートスキー場) on the eastern slopes of the mountain in the town of Iizuna. The resort also hosted events during the 2005 Special Olympics World Winter Games.

The ski resort has seven courses, with a top elevation of 1500m, with a vertical of 600m, and a base elevation of 900m. Its longest run is 2500m.

See also
 Five Mountains of Northern Shinshu
 List of mountains in Japan
 List of volcanoes in Japan

References

External links

 Iizuna Yama - Geological Survey of Japan

Gallery 

Venues of the 1998 Winter Olympics
Iizuna
Stratovolcanoes of Japan
Pleistocene stratovolcanoes
Volcanoes of Honshū